Below is a list of archives located in West Virginia, United States, and a brief description of their collections.

West Virginia archives

References

Archives
Archives in the United States
Archives
West Virginia